The Language of Cities is the second studio album by Maserati, released in 2002.

Track listing
 "Ambassador of Cinema" (6:04)
 "The Language" (7:48)
 "Moving with Heavy Hearts" (7:59)
 "Keep it Gold" (2:53)
 "Being a President Is Like Riding a Tiger" (7:57)
 "Cities" (6:54)
 "A Common Interest in Silence" (2:49)
 "There Will Always Be Someone Behind You" (7:31)

See also 

 Here Grows New York, a film with its soundtrack adapted from the album

References

2002 albums
Maserati (band) albums
Kindercore Records albums